John Joseph Nicholas Scott, 5th Earl of Eldon (24 April 1937 – 30 January 2017) was an English soldier and peer, a member of the House of Lords from 1976 to 1999. Before that, he was known formally from birth as Viscount Encombe.

The son of John Scott, 4th Earl of Eldon, and his wife Magdalen Mary Charlotte Fraser, a daughter of Simon Fraser, 14th Lord Lovat, he was educated at Ampleforth College and Trinity College, Oxford, and then commissioned as a second lieutenant into the Royal Scots Greys. He later served as a lieutenant in the Army Reserve.

On 20 October 1976, he succeeded as Earl of Eldon (a peerage created in 1821) and also as Viscount Encombe (1821) and Baron Eldon (1799). He took up his seat in the House of Lords, and from 1978 sat as a Crossbench peer.

On 1 July 1961, as Lord Encome, he married Claudine de Montjoye-Vaufrey, a daughter of Count Franz de Montjoye-Vaufrey et de la Roche. They had three children:
John Francis Scott, later 6th Earl of Eldon (born 1962)
Lady Tatiana Maria Laura Rose Columba Fidelis Scott (born 1967)
Lady Victoria Laura Maria Magdalene Scott (born 1968)

Notes

1937 births
2017 deaths
Alumni of Trinity College, Oxford
Earls in the Peerage of the United Kingdom
People educated at Ampleforth College
Royal Scots Greys officers
Scott family (England)